Tété is a French musician, born in Dakar, Senegal on 25 July 1975. His mother is from Martinique and his father is from Senegal.

Tété is described as the French version of Jeff Buckley. Tété's music can be described as an intimate, solo classical guitar musical style. He defines himself to be a "troubadour and manufacturer of pop-folk-bluesy songs with intellectual pretensions." His music combines blues, folk and pop influences, such as the Delta Blues, Lenny Kravitz, The Beatles and Bob Dylan.

Discography

Albums
Studio albums

Live albums

Compilation albums

Singles

References

External links
Official website

1975 births
living people
musicians from Dakar
French songwriters
Male songwriters
French people of Senegalese descent
French people of Martiniquais descent
French folk-pop singers
21st-century French singers
21st-century French male singers